The Toronto Railway Company (TRC) was the operator of the streetcar system in Toronto between 1891 and 1921. It electrified the horsecar system it inherited from the Toronto Street Railway, the previous operator of streetcar service in Toronto. The TRC was also a manufacturer of streetcars and rail work vehicles, a few of which were built for other streetcar and radial operators.

On August 15, 1892, the TRC became the second operator of horse-drawn streetcars in the Toronto area to convert to electric trams, the first being the Metropolitan Street Railway which electrified its horsecar line along Yonge Street within the Town of North Toronto on September 1, 1890. (In 1912, the City of Toronto would annex North Toronto.)

History

In 1891, the 30-year franchise with the Toronto Street Railway (TSR) for horsecar service expired. At the end of the TSR franchise, the city ran the horsecar system for eight months, but ended up granting another 30-year franchise to a private operator, a group involving railway entrepreneur William Mackenzie. The franchise, which involved converting the horsecar system to electric operation, went into effect on September 21, 1891.

The TRC made a one-time payment to the city of $1,453,788 for the assets of the TSR, the same amount the city paid for TSR assets when it took over the horsecar system in 1891. Each year, the TRC was required to pay the city $800 per mile of track, plus a percentage of the gross earnings.

Fares were: five cents cash for adults, six tickets for twenty-five cents; three cents cash for children with school tickets at ten for twenty-five cents; ten cents cash for night streetcars. The fare entitled the rider to a free transfer between routes.

A key requirement of the franchise agreement was that the TRC had to electrify the first line within one year of the beginning of the franchise and the last within three years. The TRC met this requirement. The first electric car ran on Church Street starting August 15, 1892, and the last horse car ran on McCaul Street on August 31, 1894.

From 1893 to 1904, the TRC had suburban radial operations, often using vehicles resembling streetcars. In 1893, the TRC took control of the Toronto and Mimico Electric Railway and Light Company along Lake Shore Road, and in 1895, the Toronto and Scarboro' Electric Railway, Light and Power Company along Kingston Road. In 1904, both suburban operations were turned over to the Toronto and York Radial Railway, thus ending the TRC's suburban operations.

On May 23, 1897, Sunday streetcar service started after city voters gave approval in a referendum earlier that month. This was controversial at the time; churches feared Sunday streetcar service would lead to other activities inappropriate for a Sunday such as sporting events and the sale of alcoholic beverages. The referendum, which had been preceded by two prior unsuccessful attempts, was won by a narrow margin of 0.7 per cent out of 32,000 votes cast.

There came to be problems with interpretation of the franchise terms for the city. A series of annexations, especially in 1908–12, significantly extended the city limits to include such areas as Dovercourt, Earlscourt, East Toronto, Midway (formerly between Toronto and East Toronto), North Toronto, and West Toronto. After many attempts to force the TRC to serve these areas, the city created its own street railway operation, the Toronto Civic Railways to do so, and built several routes. 

The TRC system deteriorated towards the end of the franchise. By 1915, there were complaints of overcrowding due to a shortage of streetcars. In December 1916, a fire destroyed the TRC's King carhouse and 163 motor cars and trailers within it. Repeated court battles did force the TRC to build new cars, but far less than what the city was requesting, and the new cars were of an old design dating from 1906, or 1908 for the newest cars. Streetcars and track were not well maintained, and carhouses and shops were obsolete or deteriorating. The TRC franchise ended on August 31, 1921, and the next day, the Toronto Transportation Commission started operating a system that combined the TRC system with the city-operated Toronto Civic Railways lines. In 1924, the city paid $11,483,500 for the assets of the TRC. The TRC ceased to exist when it was legally dissolved in 1930.

Track
In 1891, the TRC inherited  of horsecar track from its predecessor, the Toronto Street Railway. The TRC learned from the troubled experiences of the Metropolitan Street Railway in North Toronto, which had previously done a horse to electric conversion. Thus, between 1891 and 1894, the TRC replaced all the horsecar track, using heavier rail that could properly support the faster, heavier electric streetcars. The TRC used 69-pound rail on some lightly used lines, and 71-pound rail elsewhere, including all downtown track.

Until 1908, the city prohibited the TRC from making the devil strip wider. Because of the narrow devil strip, later cars were built with a taper to the roof on the passing side, and car bodies were offset to the right by four inches, sitting off-centre on the king pin. The offset allowed a wider car to safely pass another traveling in the opposite direction. In 1921, there was still  of double track with a narrow devil strip which the successor TTC widened as it replaced old TRC tracks to handle wider equipment.

Routes
Routes marked to TTC were operating on September 21, 1921, when the Toronto Railway Company's operations were taken over by the Toronto Transportation Commission. Routes marked 1923 by TTC were TRC routes discontinued by the TTC as a result of a major reorganization of routes on July 1, 1923.

City-owned tracks
The city built and owned some of the streetcar trackage operated by the TRC. The city-owned, TRC-operated tracks were:
 Queen Street East between Maclean Avenue and Neville Park Boulevard.
 The portion of the Yonge streetcar line between the CPR line and Woodlawn Avenue built in 1916, to replace Metropolitan radial tracks that the city ripped up over a franchise dispute.
 A private right-of-way from Bathurst and Front streets through Fort York to the Exhibition Place, built in 1916.
 The Ashbridge line in 1917, running south from Queen Street via Don Roadway, then west on Commissioners Street to Charry Street, to serve workers at munitions factories: Unlike other routes at the time, the Ashbridge line had no loops or wyes, and required double-ended streetcars.
 Tracks over the Prince Edward Viaduct between Sherbourne Street and Broadview Avenue, in 1918.

Subway

By 1909, there were proposals to build subways in competition to the TRC's surface streetcar lines. At this time the city was unhappy with the quality of TRC service and with the TRC's refusal to serve newly annexed areas. The TRC had an exclusive franchise for surface streetcars but competing subways would not violate the franchise.

In 1909, a British syndicate proposed two lines, one under Yonge Street and a second from East Toronto via Queen Street East, Dufferin Street and Dundas Street West to West Toronto. Voters supported this proposal in a referendum during the 1910 election, but also elected a mayor who opposed it. Thus, this proposal died.

By 1912, there was a second city proposal to build three underground routes: streetcar tunnels under Queen and Bloor Streets, and a rapid transit subway along Yonge Street. These routes would have connected with surface streetcar routes and radial railways. The idea died after voters rejected the proposal out of fear of higher taxes.

Roster

As part of the franchise agreement, the TRC was to build all its streetcars locally. Thus, almost all TRC cars were built in-house at their car shops at Front and Frederick Streets. However, the TRC felt it lacked the capacity to build enough streetcars to convert the horsecar system it inherited to electrical operation by the city-imposed deadline. Thus, the city granted the TRC an exception to purchase ten single-ended, single-truck streetcars from James Crossen-Cobourg Car Works in Cobourg, Ontario in 1893.

The TRC streetcars were made of wood over a steel underframe. Cars had a clerestory roof with a destination sign fixed near the front edge of the roof. Seats were wood slat but the TRC provided each with a seating cushion. There was a stove at the front of the car for winter heating. Early streetcars had open platforms; later cars had enclosed vestibules. The rear vestibule could have a single or double rear door. Cars with a double rear door could haul a trailer and had a two-man crew. One-man cars had a treadle-operated single rear door. There was a hook at the rear of each car to hang a baby carriage.

At first, TRC streetcars had hand brakes, but in 1905, a Torontonian developed an air brake for streetcars. Initially, streetcars did not carry an air compressor; thus, air recharging stations were required along streetcar routes. Later, on-board air compressors were installed.

After the TRC completed electrification, some horsecars were converted into trailers where one or two would be hauled by a motor car. However, horsecar trailers were found to be unsuited for the higher speed of electric streetcar operation.

Very early on, in 1894, the TRC decided on single-ended operation. Many of the early streetcars were "open" cars, where there was benches across the width of the car and thus no centre aisle. Passengers had to board on the curb-side of the open car, and for safety, there had to be a barrier along the length of the car on the opposite side. Before the summer of 1893, there were double-ended open cars, which required two men to move the barrier to the other side of the car at the end of the line. Some open cars had one-man crews, requiring a helper to be stationed at the end of the line. Having single-ended cars with loops or wyes saved staff time. Also, both open and closed motor cars could pull one or two trailers; thus, single-ended operation eliminated the time needed to rearrange the consist at the end of the line.

Open cars were popular in warm weather. When it rained, there were side curtains that one could unroll from the roof to keep one dry. However, the motorman would stand exposed to wind and rain on the front platform. To handle both warm and colder months, the TSR used the "convertible car" in which the nearside of the car could be removed in the spring, and re-connected in the fall, thus changing from an open car to a closed car. A dangerous feature of open cars was the running board where passengers could stand while the car was in motion. Because of safety concerns, the Railway and Municipal Board banned open cars from the streets on November 22, 1915.

At the end of its franchise in 1921, the TRC had 830 streetcars on its active roster that the city agreed to accept along with a number of work cars. It also had 18 open motors and 43 open trailers in storage which the city refused to accept due to the 1915 ban on open streetcars. In 1921, the TRC had twelve double-ended streetcars, three double-truck and nine single-truck; all other streetcars were single-ended. Two of the ten Crossan-built, single-truck streetcars survived to 1921. Between 1921 and 1924, the TTC retired 471 of the 830 streetcars the city accepted from the TRC, including the double-ended and Crossan-built streetcars. It retained only 351 single-end, double-track motor cars for longer term use, the last of which were retired in 1951. The TTC did retain one horsecar trailer and a single-ended streetcar from 1892, preserving them as relics ultimately to be given to a museum.

Roster summaries
The following are summaries of the TRC roster at four points during its franchise:

Work cars

The TRC had several types of work cars, all built in the TRC car shops. Here is a brief description of some of the types of non-revenue cars the TRC had:
 Construction cars were single-ended, double-truck motorized flat cars with an enclosed operator cab used to deliver rails to carhouses and yards. The TTC inherited four of them (numbers 2, 4, 7, 8) keeping their TRC numbers but prefixing them with a "W-". Today, W-4 is preserved at the Halton County Radial Railway museum.
 Crane car no. 1, built in 1913, was a flat motor with a cab and a five-ton hoist crane. It supported construction projects. Becoming TTC C-1, the crane car is today at the Halton County Radial Railway museum.
 Supply car no. 3, built in 1913, delivered motors and wheels between the motor shops and carhouses. It was essentially a flat motor with cab and an open cargo section behind the cab lined with low side walls. 
 Emergency car no. 5 was a single-truck, box motor, and carried a variety of tools to handle emergency tasks. The TTC retained this car until 1933.
 Compressor cars no. 1 and no. 2 were mobile air recharging stations for streetcars before they were equipped with their own on-board air compressors. Both were box motors; no. 1 had a single truck; no. 2 was double-truck. No. 2 had a varied career with the TTC; it was converted into an express freight motor for the Lake Simcoe line in 1927, then as snow plow TP-2 in 1936, then as subway rail maintenance car RT-1 for the Yonge subway.
 The TRC's private car was built in 1892 on a single truck car then rebuilt as a double-truck car in 1904. It had 12 chairs, carpeting, window curtains, hardwood trim, and curved windows at the front vestibule. It carried officials for inspections and special events, including trips to Old Woodbine Race Course where the TRC had a streetcar siding into the grounds. From 1912, its use declined with increased use of automobiles. The city reluctantly accepted this car at the end of the TRC franchise, but the TTC stored it unused until it was scrapped in 1931.
 Fare box car no. 28, built in 1911, somewhat resembled a passenger car, but had a freight door in the middle. It collected and distributed fare boxes, and delivered tickets and change to the carhouses. The TTC retained this car but replaced it in 1938 with an armoured car.
 The TRC built 17 snow sweepers between 1892 and 1918. The TTC inherited all 17 prefixing their TRC numbers with "S-", thus S-1 to S-17. All were scrapped between 1946 and 1948.
 The TRC built eight sprinkler cars between 1892 and 1909. Sprinklers 1 to 3 had a vertical water tank on a single-truck frame. Sprinklers 4 to 8 had horizontal tanks on a double-track frame. All such cars had operator controls on an open front platform. The TRC had a contract from the city between 1892 and 1915 to flush streets along streetcar lines. In 1915, the city started to use rubber-tire trucks.

Streetcar sales

The TRC sold a small percentage of the streetcars it built to other operators. The TRC had a subsidiary company, the Convertible Car Company of Toronto, that built cars for systems in Mexico, South America, and Western Canada. Some sales were for used streetcars that had run in Toronto. Here is a partial list of sales:
 Several large radial (interurban) cars were built for the Toronto and York Radial Railway. 
 Between 1897 and 1904, the TRC sold eight batches of double-ended, single-truck streetcars to the Winnipeg Electric Street Railway Company. The sales totalled 38 closed and 4 open cars.
 The TRC built six new single-ended, double-truck streetcars for the Monterrey Railway, Light & Power Co. in Mexico. These had only a centre door on each side of the car.
 In 1907 and 1908, the TRC sold 14 single-truck open cars to Monterrey. These cars were part of a group of 24 cars built in 1894 as doubled-ended cars before the TRC decided on single-ended operation. The Toronto Suburban Railway also bought one of these cars. These were used-car sales. 

About that time, the Toronto and York Radial Railway, the Toronto Suburban Railway and the Winnipeg Electric Street Railway Company were all affiliated with the owners of the Toronto Railway Company. According to a source, the Monterrey Railway, Light & Power Co. was founded in Toronto.

Preservation
The following is a list of preserved TRC passenger and work cars. All except car 327 were built by the TRC, and all were used by the TTC.

Facilities

Carhouses
In all, the TRC had seven carhouses, although no more than six at any one time. They are listed here alphabetically by name:

Shops and work yards
The TRC had several facilities near the intersection of Front and Frederick streets. Many of these facilities were inherited from the Toronto Street Railway (TSR), and the TRC repurposed them for the electric streetcar system. In 1924, the TTC moved some functions from the facilities in this area to the then-new Hillcrest Complex. The following is a list of facilities in the Front and Frederick area:

Today, only the powerhouse building still stands, now occupied by a theatre. Condominiums occupy most of the former facility sites.

Revenue-generating facilities
Away from downtown, the TRC had a revenue-generating facility:

See also

 Toronto streetcar system
 Toronto streetcar system rolling stock including ex-TRC vehicles
 List of Ontario railways
 List of defunct Canadian railways

References

External links

The charter of the Toronto Railway Company
TRC trackage as of June 1921 prepared by the Upper Canada Railway Society

Toronto Transit Commission
Defunct rolling stock manufacturers of Canada
Railway lines opened in 1891
Railway lines closed in 1921
Defunct intermodal transport authorities
Defunct Ontario railways
4 ft 10⅞ in gauge railways
1891 establishments in Ontario
1921 disestablishments in Ontario
Electric vehicle manufacturers of Canada
Canadian companies established in 1891
Electric railways in Canada
Street railways in Ontario